Stocki (feminine: Stocka) is a surname. Notable people with this surname include:

 Elaine Stocki (born 1979), Canadian artist and academic
 Roman Smal-Stocki (1893–1969), Ukrainian diplomat
 Tomasz Stocki (born 1953), Polish sailor

See also 
 

Polish-language surnames
Ukrainian-language surnames